Oscar Fuentes (born 10 July 1954) is an Argentine equestrian. He competed in two events at the 1996 Summer Olympics.

References

1954 births
Living people
Argentine male equestrians
Olympic equestrians of Argentina
Equestrians at the 1996 Summer Olympics
Place of birth missing (living people)